Kazakhstan competed at the 2002 Winter Paralympics in Salt Lake City, United States. One competitor, Zeinolla Seitov, from Kazakhstan competed in three events in cross-country skiing. He won no medals and so did not place in the medal table.

See also 
 Kazakhstan at the Paralympics
 Kazakhstan at the 2002 Winter Olympics

References 

Kazakhstan at the Paralympics
2002 in Kazakhstani sport
Nations at the 2002 Winter Paralympics